Şaja Batyrowiç Batyrow (1908–1965) was a Soviet politician who served as the first secretary of the Communist Party of Turkmenistan. He also was head of the Academy of Sciences of Turkmenistan from 1959 to 1965. 

His term as first secretary lasted from March 1947 until 1950, when Balyş Öwezow succeeded him.

He received the Order of Lenin.

Legacy
A street is named after him in the capital of Turkmenistan, Ashgabat.

Notes

References

1908 births
1965 deaths
Soviet politicians
People from Ahal Region
People from Transcaspian Oblast
First secretaries of the Communist Party of Turkmenistan
Second convocation members of the Supreme Soviet of the Soviet Union
Third convocation members of the Supreme Soviet of the Soviet Union
Recipients of the Order of Lenin
Recipients of the Order of the Red Banner of Labour